Şirinyer Racecourse is a horse racing track located at Şirinyer neighborhood in Buca district of İzmir, Turkey.

It is the country's oldest racecourse founded in 1856. The first-ever horse race in Turkey was held in Şirinyer Racecourse on September 23, 1856.

The racecourse covers an area of  consisting of facilities for racing, training and barns. The racecourse hosts night races since 2007, the first venue in Turkey to do so. The racecourse was renovated in 2000 and 2015.

References

Horse racing venues in Turkey
Sports venues in İzmir
Buca District
Event venues established in 1856
1856 establishments in the Ottoman Empire
19th-century architecture in Turkey